Interpolation is a method of constructing new data points within the range of a discrete set of known data points in the mathematical field of numerical analysis.

Interpolation may also refer to:

Science and technology 
Interpolation space, in mathematical analysis, the space "in between" two other Banach spaces
Craig interpolation, in mathematical logic, a result about the relationship between logical theories
 Interpolation (computer graphics), the generation of intermediate frames
 Image scaling, the resizing of a digital image
 Inbetweening, the generation of intermediate video frames
 Motion interpolation, a form of video processing
 Interpolation theory, an explanation of the alternation of generations in plants
 String interpolation, in computing, the substitution of variables by their values

Music
 Interpolation (classical music), musical material inserted between two logically succeeding functions
 Interpolation (popular music), the inclusion of a re-recorded (rather than sampled) melody from a previous song

Manuscripts
 Interpolation (manuscripts), a passage not written by the original author
Christian interpolation, the insertion of Christian text into Jewish or secular manuscripts